The 1994/95 NTFL season was the 74th season of the Northern Territory Football League (NTFL).

St Marys had completed another perfect season to claim there 20th premiership title defeating the Darwin in the grand final by 97 points.

Grand Final

References

Northern Territory Football League seasons
NTFL